Waterfox is an open-source web browser that is forked from Firefox and developed by System1. There are official Waterfox releases for Windows, macOS, and Linux.

Divisions

Waterfox
Waterfox shares core features and technologies like the Gecko browser engine and support for Firefox Add-ons with Firefox.

Waterfox Classic
Waterfox Classic is a version of the browser based on an older version of the Gecko engine that supports legacy XUL and XPCOM add-on capabilities that Firefox removed in version 57.

Vulnerability
Waterfox Classic has multiple unpatched security advisories. The developer states that "changes between versions so numerous between ESRs making merging difficult if not impossible".

History

Waterfox was first released by Alex Kontos on March 27, 2011 for 64-bit Windows. The Mac build was introduced on May 14, 2015 with the release of version 38.0, the Linux build was introduced on December 20, 2016 with the release of version 50.0, and an Android build was first introduced on October 10, 2017 in version 55.2.2.

From July 22, 2015 to November 12, 2015, Waterfox had its own search-engine called "Storm" that would raise funds for charity and Waterfox. Storm was developed with over £2 million of investor funding and powered by Yahoo! Search.

In December 2019, System1, an advertising company which portrays itself as privacy-focused, acquired Waterfox.

See also 

 Firefox
 GNU IceCat
 Pale Moon
 Basilisk
 K-Meleon

References

External links

2011 software
Free software programmed in C++
Free web browsers
Gecko-based software
MacOS web browsers
Mozilla
Portable software
Software that uses XUL
Software using the Mozilla license
Web browsers based on Firefox
Android web browsers
Linux web browsers
Windows web browsers